"You Should Be Mine (The Woo Woo Song)" is a 1986 song by Jeffrey Osborne from the album Emotional. It was his biggest pop hit when released as a single, reaching #13 on the Billboard Hot 100 pop chart. On other US charts, "You Should Be Mine" peaked at #2 on both the Hot Black Singles and Adult Contemporary charts.

Background
"The Woo Woo Song" is the title in parentheses because Jeffrey's little daughter did not know the exact title, she identified the song saying "Daddy, sing 'The Woo Woo Song'!"  Jeffrey thus affectionately nicknamed the track.

Chart positions

In popular culture
The 17th episode of Cosby titled "Valentine's Day" features Jeffrey Osborne guest starring and performing the song.
The song was heard on the daytime serial Santa Barbara.

References

1986 singles
Jeffrey Osborne songs
Songs written by Bruce Roberts (singer)
Songs written by Andy Goldmark
1986 songs
Song recordings produced by Richard Perry
Contemporary R&B ballads
A&M Records singles
1980s ballads